Al-Yarmouk Sports Club is a Syrian sports club based in Aleppo, best known for their football. Founded in 1925, Al-Yarmouk is the 2nd oldest sports organization in Syria. The club have won the Syrian regions football championship for several times before the establishment of the official Syrian football league in 1966. They were the winners of the Syrian Cup in 1963–1964, being the only official achievement in the club's history. Between 1925–1946, Al-Yarmouk was known as Homenetmen Aleppo. In 1946, the name was changed to Al-Nadi As-Souri (Arabic: the Syrian Club) until 1971 when it was renamed Al-Yarmouk. The club play their home games at the 7 April Municipal Stadium.

Al-Yarmouk SC are also known for their basketball teams (men and women). As of 2012, 9 types of sports are being practiced by the club.

History
With the arrival of the Armenian refugees and survivors of the Armenian genocide, Aleppo became an active cultural and educational centre for the Armenian community of Syria. Armenians have founded many cultural, scouting and sport organizations in the city. The young generation was mainly interested in football and athletics. The Armenian organizations formed their own football teams to compete with each other within the community.

In 1925, by the efforts of Levon Apkarian, Garabed Hovagimian, Vahan Tamzarian and many others, 6 of the created Armenian football teams; Aghpyur, Ararat, Ardziv, Gaidzag, Nubarian and Dalvorig were unified to form the Homenetmen Aleppo sporting club and football team as a branch of the Homenetmen Armenian worldwide sport and scouting organization.

The first directing committee of the newly established Homenetmen Aleppo included:
 Dikran Aghajanian
 Levon Apkarian
 Mihran Garabedian
 Luther Masbanjian
 Sahag Khachadurian
 Levon Babigian
 Shavarsh Bekiarian

Prior to the foundation of the Syrian official football league, the club have competed in various regional competitions in the Aleppo Governorate such as the regional league of Aleppo and the Aleppo Municipality Shield.

They have played in the Syrian Premier League starting from the first ever season in 1966–1967 until 1982–1983 when they were relegated to the 2nd division. Since then, the team failed to return to the top level.

During 2011–2012 season, the club came 5th in the Syrian 2nd Division; 4th Regional Group, thus maintaining their place in the current level (second highest in Syria) for the next season.

Football team achievements
 Syrian Cup: 1
Winner : 1964

Current squad

 (captain)

Coaching and medical staff
 Manager: Khachig Sahagian
 Physician: Dr. Murad Muradian
 Administrator: Hovsep Kharajian

Administration
Administrative Board of Al-Yarmouk SC Aleppo:

{| class="wikitable"
|-
!Office
!Name
|-
|President of the Board
|Kevork Mavian
|-
|Member of the Board
|Dr. Harout Bakkalian
|-
|Member of the Board
|Serge Balabanian
|-
|Member of the Board
|Kevork Mavian
|-
|Member of the Board
|Apig Basmajian
|-
|Member of the Board
|Maria Kapoujian
|-
|Member of the Board
|Yeran Bakkalian
|-

References

External links
Official page

Yarmouk
Yarmouk
Sport in Aleppo
1925 establishments in Mandatory Syria